Joan is the surname of:

Bernat Joan i Marí (born 1960), Catalan politician
Joel Joan (born 1970), Catalan actor, scriptwriter and director
Martí Joan de Galba (died 1490), co-author of the Catalan epic Tirant lo Blanc

See also
Josep Tarradellas i Joan (1899–1988), Catalan politician

Surnames from given names